Vali Khorsandipish Kenari (born January 25, 1980) is an Iranian footballer that previously plays for Persitara North Jakarta in the Indonesia Super League.

References

External links

1980 births
Living people
Association football defenders
Iranian footballers
Iranian expatriate footballers
Iranian expatriate sportspeople in Indonesia
Expatriate footballers in Indonesia
Liga 1 (Indonesia) players
Persitara Jakarta Utara players
Persiwa Wamena players